Wang Mingfang (November 1952 – 16 September 2016) was a Chinese politician who served as Chairman of the Anhui Provincial Committee of the Chinese People's Political Consultative Conference (CPPCC) from 2011 until his death in 2016.

Career

Wang was born in Longjiang County, Heilongjiang Province. Wang joined the Communist Party of China in 1997. He first became part of the Anhui CPPCC provincial committee in 1997. From 2002 to 2015, he was an alternate member of the 16th and 17th CPC Central Committee.

In June 2015, Wang led the Anhui province delegation, in a 2-day state visit, to the Ústí nad Labem Region, Czech Republic. The aim of the visit was to strengthen mutual ties between Anhui and Ústí.

On 16 September 2016, Wang died of an illness in Shanghai, at the age of 63.

References 

1952 births
People's Republic of China politicians from Heilongjiang
Chinese Communist Party politicians from Heilongjiang
People from Qiqihar
2016 deaths
Political office-holders in Anhui
Alternate members of the 16th Central Committee of the Chinese Communist Party
Alternate members of the 17th Central Committee of the Chinese Communist Party